The Fuling Shibangou Yangtze River Bridge  is a cable-stayed bridge over the Yangtze River in Fuling District, Chongqing, China. Completed in 2009, it has a main span of  placing it among the longest cable-stayed bridges in the world.

See also
List of largest cable-stayed bridges
Yangtze River bridges and tunnels

External links

References
http://en.structurae.de/structures/data/index.cfm?id=s0032648
https://web.archive.org/web/20120226214729/http://www.ccrdi.com/Item/1607.aspx

Bridges in Chongqing
Bridges over the Yangtze River
Cable-stayed bridges in China
Bridges completed in 2009